Elia Giani (born 20 December 2000) is an Italian footballer who plays as a forward for  club Fiorenzuola on loan from Pisa.

Club career
He was raised in the youth teams of Pisa and began receiving call-ups to the senior squad late in the 2016–17 Serie B season, but did not see time on the field. He spent most of the 2017–18 season on loan to Serie D club Ponsacco.

In August 2018, he moved to the Under-19 squad of Sassuolo.

On 31 July 2019, he returned to Pisa.

He made his Serie B debut for Pisa on 8 December 2019 in a game against Virtus Entella. He substituted Marius Marin in the 81st minute.

On 16 January 2021, he was loaned to Serie C club Pontedera.

On 27 July 2021, he was loaned again to Fiorenzuola in the Serie C. On 20 August 2022, Giani returned to Fiorenzuola on a new loan.

References

External links
 

2000 births
Living people
People from Empoli
Footballers from Tuscany
Italian footballers
Association football forwards
Serie B players
Serie C players
Serie D players
Pisa S.C. players
F.C. Ponsacco 1920 S.S.D. players
U.S. Città di Pontedera players
U.S. Fiorenzuola 1922 S.S. players
Sportspeople from the Metropolitan City of Florence
21st-century Italian people